T. P. Elumalai was an Indian politician and former Member of the Legislative Assembly of Tamil Nadu. He was elected to the Tamil Nadu legislative assembly from Saidapet constituency as an Indian National Congress candidate in 1952 election. The second winner was N. Ramakrishna Iyer. He was elected from Ponneri constituency as an Indian National Congress candidate in 1957, and 1962 elections. He was one of the two winners in the 1957 election, the other being V. Govindasami Naidu.

References 

Madras MLAs 1952–1957
Indian National Congress politicians from Tamil Nadu
Living people
Year of birth missing (living people)
Madras MLAs 1962–1967
Madras MLAs 1957–1962